Cinturón a Mallorca was a road bicycle race held annually on the island of Mallorca, Spain. Between 2005 and 2011, it was classified as a 2.2 event on the UCI Europe Tour. The race was not held after 2011 because of financial problems.

Winners

External links
 Official Website 

UCI Europe Tour races
Cycle races in Spain
Recurring sporting events established in 1964
1964 establishments in Spain
Sport in Mallorca
2011 disestablishments in Spain
Defunct cycling races in Spain
Recurring sporting events disestablished in 2011